Mari Lund Arnem (born 27 January 1986) is a Norwegian politician for the Socialist Left Party.

She served as a deputy representative to the Parliament of Norway from Oslo during the term 2009–2013. From March to April 2012 she served as a full member of Parliament, covering for cabinet minister Heikki Holmås between two cabinet reshuffles.

References

1986 births
Living people
Members of the Storting
Socialist Left Party (Norway) politicians
Politicians from Oslo
Women members of the Storting
21st-century Norwegian politicians
21st-century Norwegian women politicians